Svetlaya (lit. light, bright) is an urban locality (an urban-type settlement) in Terneysky District of Primorsky Krai, Russia, located in the mouth of the Svetlaya River. Population:

Economy
There is a large fish processing factory in Svetlaya.

References

Urban-type settlements in Primorsky Krai